John Ritchie McVicar (June 4, 1903 — February 20, 1952) was a Canadian ice hockey player who played 88 games in the National Hockey League for the Montreal Maroons between 1930 and 1932. The rest of his career, which lasted from 1923 to 1937, wasspent in various minor leagues. He was born in Renfrew, Ontario. He died in 1952 in Grimsby, Ontario.

Career statistics

Regular season and playoffs

References

External links 
 

1903 births
1952 deaths
Canadian ice hockey defencemen
Chicago Cardinals (ice hockey) players
Ice hockey people from Ontario
Montreal Maroons players
Newark Bulldogs players
Ontario Hockey Association Senior A League (1890–1979) players
People from Renfrew County
Providence Reds players
Quebec Castors players
Windsor Bulldogs (1929–1936) players